Patrick Bürger (born 27 June 1987) is an Austrian professional footballer who plays for SC Pinkafeld.

Club career
On 23 December 2021, Bürger signed with SC Pinkafeld in the fourth-tier Landesliga Burgenland.

International career
Bürger made his debut for the senior national team of his country on 1 June 2012, in the 3–2 win over Ukraine.

References

External links

1987 births
People from Oberwart
Footballers from Burgenland
Living people
Austrian footballers
Association football forwards
Austria international footballers
Austrian Football Bundesliga players
2. Liga (Austria) players
SV Mattersburg players
TSV Hartberg players
SV Lafnitz players